Levi Chavez is a former police officer in Albuquerque, New Mexico, who was charged with the 2007 death of his 26-year-old wife, Tera Chavez. In August 2013, Chavez was acquitted of the murder charges.

Levi was initially charged with murdering his wife with his police issued Glock and making it appear as a suicide. The case made national headlines in 2013 as more details came to light about the case and about Levi Chavez' personal life.

In December 2013, it was made public that Chavez had relinquished his police officer certification.

Death of his wife 

The night prior to the death of his wife Tera, Levi had spent the night at his girlfriend's house. The morning of October 22, 2007, he allegedly returned to the couple's home in Los Lunas, New Mexico, where he discovered the body of his wife. Valencia County sheriffs initially ruled the death as a suicide due to the "close proximity of the gun to the body."

Personal life 
As the murder case gained more attention from the media and public, Chavez and the Albuquerque Police Department became the targets of heavy scrutiny. Through witness testimony, the public learned that Chavez had been having a number of affairs while married to Tera Chavez. Some of the affairs were with female APD officers.

References

External links
 Albuquerque Journal articles regarding Levi Chavez

American police officers
People acquitted of murder
People from Albuquerque, New Mexico
Living people
People from Los Lunas, New Mexico
Year of birth missing (living people)